Bombaj Štampa is a Bosnian pop-rock group from Sarajevo dating formed in 1982. It, together with Zabranjeno Pušenje and Elvis J. Kurtović & His Meteors, participated in creating a new movement known as New Primitivism in Ex-Yugoslavia.

The group was founded by guitarist Nedim Babović in 1982, but initially never had a stable lineup and therefore didn't perform much. In May 1983, aspiring actor Branko Đurić who sang with SCH joined the band.

One of their early hits was the football chant "Željo to je moj tim" ("Zeljo, that's my team").

Bombaj Štampa was not active from 1992 till 2008. In December 2008, group members reunited for a concert in Sarajevo featuring original guitarist Nedim Babović and drummer Dragan Bajić along with bassist Ernie Mendillo (The Brandos). More concerts followed and an album of new material was released in the Spring of 2010.

On 25 July 2019 Đuro and his band gave two-hour performance on Zenica city square – as one of many concerts during Zenica summer fest 2019 (second main show of this festival). They performed, among other songs, their new song called "Čekić" – to appear on the album that was due to be released in September 2019 – as well as one opera.

Band members

Branko Đurić - vocals, guitar
Nedim Babović - guitar
Neno Jeleč - bass
Nikša Bratoš - keyboards
Ademir Volić - drums
Dragan Bajic - drums
Ernie Mendillo - Bass (2008–present)
Gašper Oblak - drums (2010–present)

Discography 

Studio albums:

 Bombaj Štampa (Diskoton, 1987)
 Ja Mnogo Bolje Letim Sam (Diskoton, 1990)
 Neka DJ Odmah Dole CJ (Dallas Records, 2010)

References

External links

Bosnia and Herzegovina musical groups
Musical groups established in 1982